Kim Bong-soo (born December 26, 1999) is a South Korean professional football midfielder playing for Jeju United of the K League 1.

Career statistics

Club

References

External links
 

1999 births
Living people
South Korean footballers
K League 1 players
Jeju United FC players
Association football midfielders